Among guitar tunings, all-fifths tuning refers to the set of tunings in which each interval between consecutive open strings is a perfect fifth. All-fifths tuning is also called fifths,  perfect fifths, or mandoguitar. The conventional "standard tuning" consists of perfect fourths and a single major third between the g and b strings:
E-A-d-g-b-e'
All-fifths tuning has the set of open strings
C-G-d-a-e'-b' or G'-D-A-e-b-f',
which have intervals of 3 octaves minus a half-step between the lowest and highest string. The conventional tuning has an interval of 2 octaves between lowest and highest string.

All-fifths tuning is a tuning in intervals of perfect fifths like that of a mandolin or a violin. It has a wide range. It was used by jazz guitarist Carl Kress in the form
 B'-F-c-g-d'-a'.

An approximation: new standard tuning
All-fifths tuning has been approximated with tunings that avoid the high b' replacing it with a g' in the New Standard Tuning of King Crimson's Robert Fripp, which has been taught in Guitar Craft courses. Guitar Craft, which has been succeeded by Guitar Circle, has taught Fripp's tuning to 3,000 students.

Relation with all-fourths tuning

All-fifths tuning is closely related to all-fourths tuning. All-fifths tuning is based on the perfect fifth (the interval with seven semitones), and all-fourths tuning is based on the perfect fourth (five semitones). The perfect-fifth and perfect-fourth intervals are inversions of one another, and the chords of all-fourth and all-fifths are paired as inverted chords. Consequently, chord charts for all-fourths tunings may be used for left-handed all-fifths tuning.

See also

All fourths
Perfect fifth
Guitar tunings

Notes

References

Further reading

External links
 Guitar Tunings - Guitar School Online
 Entering The Fifth Dimension

Regular guitar-tunings